Norm Lake is a lake located on Vancouver Island and is an expansion of upper Oyster River, west of Courtenay.

References

Alberni Valley
Lakes of Vancouver Island
Comox Land District